Milford Public Schools is the public school district in Milford, Massachusetts, United States. As of 2016, Kevin McIntyre, Ed.D is the superintendent of schools. The school committee includes a chairperson, a vice chairperson, and five members.

History
In 1997 members of the school system created and promoted a program where schoolchildren interact with senior citizens. In 2007 the school district placed all of its schools in a curicculum audit, due to the growing immigrant population from Brazil and Ecuador.

Schools
Secondary:
 Milford High School (MHS) (9-12)
 Stacy Middle School (SMS) (6-8)
Primary:
 Brookside Elementary School (K-2)
 Memorial Elementary School (K-2)
 Woodland Elementary School (3-5)
Pre-school:
 Shining Star Early Childhood Center (SSECC)

References

External links

 Milford Public Schools
 Consigli, Craig A. (editorial by Middle School East principal) "http://www.milforddailynews.com/news/x1809787872/In-Milford-Public-Schools-Kids-to-connect-with-area-professionals." Milford Daily News. October 19, 2010.

Athletics 
 Milford High School provides 21 athletic teams throughout the Spring, Fall, and Winter seasons.
 Sports played in the Spring: baseball, softball, lacrosse, tennis, track, and volleyball.
 Sports played in the Fall: football, cheering, cross country, field hockey, golf, soccer, and volleyball.
 Sports played in the Winter: Alpine Skiing, basketball, cheering, ice hockey, indoor track, swimming, weightlifting, and wrestling.

School districts in Massachusetts
Milford, Massachusetts